NASCAR's Most Popular Driver Award is awarded to the most popular NASCAR driver in the Cup Series, Xfinity Series, and Gander RV & Outdoors Truck Series every year since 1956. It started as a poll of the drivers and then all NASCAR Cup Series competitors; today, it is voted for by fans across the United States.

The award is presented by the National Motorsports Press Association (NMPA). Sponsored by Hamburger Helper in 2010, it was also sponsored by Wheaties in 2011. The ceremony presenting the award is called the NASCAR Awards Banquet, and it is held in Nashville, Tennessee in November of each year.

The winner of the most awards is Bill Elliott with 16 in the NASCAR Cup Series. Elliott Sadler has the most with four awards in the Xfinity Series, and Johnny Benson Jr. has the most awards at three in the Gander RV & Outdoors Truck Series.

Dale Earnhardt Jr. has the second-most awards (15) and holds the longest streak, winning the award in 2003 and every year until his retirement in 2017.

Recipients

Cup Series

Xfinity Series

Craftsman Truck Series

Mexico Series

Multiple winners

References

External links
Sprint Cup Series
Xfinity Series 
Camping World Truck Series 
Wheaties Fuel Most Popular Driver

Most Popular Driver Award
Awards established in 1956
1956 establishments in the United States